Melaleuca eulobata is a plant in the myrtle family, Myrtaceae and is endemic to the west coast of Western Australia. It is a shrub resembling Melaleuca campanae with its heads of pink flowers in late spring but is distinguished from that species by its sepals - in M. campane these are reduced to a ring of tissue but M. eulobata has distinct calyx lobes.

Description

The flowers are purple and arranged in heads on the ends of branches which continue to grow after flowering, sometimes also in the upper leaf axils. There are five bundles of stamens around the flower, each with 9 or 10 stamens.

Taxonomy and naming
Melaleuca eulobata was first formally described in 1999 by Lyndley Craven in Australian Systematic Botany from a specimen collected on the road to Monkey Mia. The specific epithet (eulobata) is from the Ancient Greek eu- meaning “well", "thoroughly” or "truly" and lobos, "lobe", referring to the distinct calyx lobes.

Distribution and habitat
This melaleuca occurs near Shark Bay in the Carnarvon and Yalgoo biogeographic regions where it grows in scrubland in pebbly sand.

Conservation status
Melaleuca eulobata is listed as "not threatened" by the Government of Western Australia Department of Parks and Wildlife.

References

eulobata
Plants described in 1999
Endemic flora of Western Australia
Taxa named by Lyndley Craven